Gwaramari is a Newa cuisine which literally means round bread- “Gwara” meaning round and “mari” meaning traditional bread. The food is popular in Kathmandu area. It is eaten in breakfast usually served with a milk tea.

Gwaramari is prepared by mixing flour with baking powder, ginger, garlic, cumin, coriander, and salt and pepper. The mix is stirred with water forming a thick doughy paste. The paste is left for an overnight. Next day, the paste is fried in chunks in a deep boiling oil until it becomes golden brown and crisp on the outside.

References

Food and drink in Nepal
Breads